JS Clayden (born Jonathan Seth Clayden, 24 March 1971) is a British singer/songwriter. He is best known as the lead vocalist of the band Pitchshifter. He moved to several towns in the United Kingdom, settling in Nottingham, England for a number of years before emigrating to Los Angeles, California. He is also the brother of Pitchshifter's bassist, Mark Clayden.

Biography 
In 1989, Clayden, along with his brother and bassist/programmer Mark Clayden, formed the musical group Pitchshifter (then called "Pitch Shifter"), going on to found PSI Records in 2002.

Career 
He has worked with producers such as Dave Jerden and Machine. Other collaborators include longtime friend Jello Biafra. He also completed remixes for bands like The Stereophonics, Prong, Clawfinger and Pigface. He has also commissioned a wide range of mixes from the likes of Rob Swift, Luke Vibert, DJ Punc Roc and Therapy?. He has also appeared on the This Is Menace album The Scene Is Dead, in the track "Cut Us (And We Bleed)".

References

External links 
 Pitchshifter official site
 PSI Records

1971 births
Alumni of De Montfort University
Alumni of Middlesex University
English heavy metal singers
English male singers
English rock singers
Living people
Musicians from London
Pigface members
21st-century English singers
21st-century British male singers